Miro Max Maria Muheim (born 24 March 1998) is a Swiss professional footballer who plays as a midfielder for 2. Bundesliga club Hamburger SV.

Club career
After a ten-year spell with FC Zürich, Muheim joined English club Chelsea in July 2014. Muheim went onto enjoy an impressive debut season, netting eleven times in nineteen games during the under-18 campaign and made his under-21 debut a year later. However, during the 2016–17 campaign, Muheim became a bit-player and therefore, returned to his boyhood club, Zürich on loan for the remainder of the campaign. Muheim failed to make a single appearance during his time back at Zürich and instead returned to Chelsea in June 2017.

On 31 January 2018, Muheim returned to Switzerland to join Swiss Super League club St. Gallen on a permanent basis. Four days later, he made his professional debut during St. Gallen's 2–0 away defeat against Young Boys, replacing Silvan Gönitzer in the 80th minute.

On 15 June 2021, it was announced that Muheim would join 2. Bundesliga side, Hamburger SV on a season-long loan. He went onto feature 27 times, scoring once, before making the deal permanent in March 2022.

International career
Muheim has represented Switzerland consecutively from under-15 to under-21 level.

Career statistics

References

1998 births
Living people
People from the canton of Uri
Swiss men's footballers
Switzerland youth international footballers
Association football midfielders
Swiss Super League players
Swiss Challenge League players
2. Bundesliga players
FC Zürich players
Chelsea F.C. players
FC St. Gallen players
Hamburger SV players
Swiss expatriate footballers
Expatriate footballers in England
Swiss expatriate sportspeople in England
Expatriate footballers in Germany
Swiss expatriate sportspeople in Germany